Dreaming #11 is the second EP by guitarist Joe Satriani, released on November 1, 1988 through Relativity Records and reissued on May 27, 1997 through Epic Records. The EP reached No. 42 on the U.S. Billboard 200 and remained on that chart for 26 weeks. Its sole studio track, "The Crush of Love", reached No. 6 on Billboard'''s Mainstream Rock chart and was nominated for Best Rock Instrumental Performance at the 1990 Grammy Awards; this being Satriani's second such nomination. The remaining three tracks were recorded live during the Surfing with the Alien (1987) tour. The title track, absent on the EP, would later be released on Satriani's 1993 compilation album Time Machine. Dreaming #11 was certified Gold on August 15, 1991.

Critical reception

Phil Carter at AllMusic gave Dreaming #11'' 2.5 stars out of five, calling it "something of an oddity" and "A recommended disc for musicians and fans, but not essential to the casual collector."

Track listing

Personnel

Joe Satriani – guitar, keyboard, bass (track 1), remixing, production
Jeff Campitelli – drums (track 1)
Jonathan Mover – drums (tracks 2–4)
Bongo Bob Smith – percussion (track 1), sound replacement
Stuart Hamm – bass (tracks 2–4)
David Bianco – engineering (tracks 2–4)
John Cuniberti – engineering, remixing, production
David Plank – engineering assistance
Bernie Grundman – mastering

Chart performance

Album

Singles

Awards

Certifications

References

External links
Dreaming #11 at satriani.com
In Review: Joe Satriani "Dreaming #11" at Guitar Nine Records

Joe Satriani albums
1988 EPs
Relativity Records EPs
Grammy Award for Best Rock Instrumental Performance